Abu al-Hasan Ali bin Ibrahim bin Muhammad al-Ansari al-Balancy is generally known as Ibn Saad al-Khair (Arabic: ابن سعد الخير), is an Arab Andalusian linguist, writer and poet. He lived in the twelfth century AD/sixth century AH. He was born and grew up in Valencia. He stood out in the science of language and literature. He taught in Valencia and wrote many books, explanations and poems. He died in Seville.

Life 
His full name is Abu Al-Hassan Ali bin Ibrahim bin Muhammad bin Issa bin Saad Al-Khair Al-Ansari Al-Balancy. He is of Castilian heritage. Ibn Saad al-Khair was born in the year 510 AH / 1116 AD in Valencia in the Valencian sect and grew up there during the era of the kings of the cults. He was taught by several scholars of Valencia such as : Abu Al-Walid Muhammad bin Abdullah bin Khaira, and Abu Al-Walid Ibn Al-Dabbagh. He worked in teaching in Valencia his whole life. 

One work was It came in Al-Wafi with deaths (Original title: Alwafi Bialwafayat), “He was with his codification in Arabic, and his progress in literature, attributed to heedlessness that overcame him, and he had wonderful messages. Shams Al-Din Al-Dhahabi also said, “He was a master of calligraphy, an eloquent writer, a glorious poet, at birth. And there was a known heedlessness.”

Ibn Saad Al Khair died in Rabi` al-Akhir 571 / October 1175 in Seville.

Works 
 Al-Halal fi Sharh Al-Jamal (Alhilal Fi Sharh Aljumlu) by Al-Zajji
 Earring appended to the speech (Alqurt Almudhayil Ealaa Alkalami), for Al Mubrd
 The Emblem of the Statement and Farida Al-Oqyan (Jadhwat Albayan Wafaridat Aleuqyan)
 The unique "abbreviation of contract" (Mukhtasar Aleaqda)
 Famous Muwashshahins in Andalusia" (Mashahir Aalmuashahin Bial'andilisi), he mentioned them according to the method of conquest in Al-Mutamah

References 

Poets from al-Andalus
12th-century Arabic poets